Intelsat III F-2 was a communications satellite operated by Intelsat. Launched in 1968 it was operated in geostationary orbit at a longitude of 24 degrees west for around eighteen months.

Spacecraft 
The second of eight Intelsat III satellites to be launched, Intelsat III F-2 was built by TRW. The satellite carried an SVM-2 apogee motor for propulsion and was equipped with two transponders powered by body-mounted solar cells generating 183 watts of power. It was designed for a five-year service life.

Launch 
The launch of Intelsat III F-2 made use of a Delta M rocket flying from Launch Complex 17A at the Cape Canaveral Air Force Station. The launch took place at 00:32 GMT on 19 December 1968, with the spacecraft entering a geosynchronous transfer orbit. Intelsat III F-2 subsequently fired its apogee motor to achieve geostationary orbit. It was operated at a longitude of 24° west, over Brazil; however it ceased operations after only a year and a half in orbit, in mid-1971.

Orbit 
Intelsat III F-2 remains in a graveyard orbit as an orbital debris.

See also 

 1968 in spaceflight

References 

Intelsat satellites
Spacecraft launched in 1968